Morkit may refer to:
 Anthraquinone, a pharmaceutical
 Morkit, Iran, a village